Sir Guy Howard Weston (born 3 July 1960) is a British businessman and philanthropist.

Biography
Weston was born on 3 July 1960 in Sydney, Australia. He is the eldest son of Garry Weston and Mary Weston, and brother of George G. Weston. His paternal grandfather was W. Garfield Weston.

Weston was educated at Westminster School and Merton College, Oxford. He read for the Bar, and then took an MBA at INSEAD.

Career
Weston began his career as an investment banker at Morgan, Grenfell & Co. from 1984 to 1987. He was the managing director of Jacksons of Piccadilly from 1990 to 1993, and Ryvita from 1993 to 2000. He was the chairman of Heal's from 2001 to 2012. He was a non-executive director of Carpetright from 2005 to 2011.

Weston has been the chairman of Wittington Investments since 2012.

Philanthropy
Weston is the chairman of the Garfield Weston Foundation. Since Weston’s appointment as chairman, the Foundation has become the largest grant-making foundation in the UK, with total grants exceeding £1 billion. In December 2020, Sir Guy was recognized for the expertise and strategic advice devoted both to the Foundation and the charities it has supported during his 20-year Chairmanship and 35-year role as Trustee.

He serves on the board of trustees of the Thrombosis Research Institute. He is an honorary fellow of Merton College, Oxford  and an honorary fellow of the Royal College of Art.

Weston has led a number of successful campaigns to help charities raise funds for causes, including the Bodleian Library in Oxford and Westminster Abbey
He has also given his expertise to support charities’ strategy and income, including serving on the advisory panel for the Royal Society and chairing the commercial enterprise for the Imperial War Museum. 

He was knighted in the 2021 New Year Honours for services to philanthropy and charity.

Personal life
Weston married Charlotte Emily Brunet in 1986; they have three sons and one daughter.

References

External links
 Garlfield Weston Foundation

1960 births
Living people
20th-century British businesspeople
21st-century British businesspeople
Alumni of Merton College, Oxford
British people of Canadian descent
British philanthropists
Businesspeople awarded knighthoods
Businesspeople from Sydney
Conservative Party (UK) donors
Fellows of Merton College, Oxford
INSEAD alumni
Knights Bachelor
People educated at Westminster School, London
Guy Weston